C++20 is a version of the ISO/IEC 14882 standard for the C++ programming language. C++20 replaced the prior version of the C++ standard, called C++17. The standard was technically finalized by WG21 at the meeting in Prague in February 2020, approved on 4 September 2020, and published in December 2020.

Features 

C++20 adds more new major features than C++14 or C++17. Changes that have been accepted into C++20 include:

Language 

 concepts, with terse syntax
 modules
 designated initializers (based on the C99 feature, and common g++ extension)
 [=, this] as a lambda capture
 template parameter lists on lambdas
 three-way comparison using the "spaceship operator", operator <=>
 initialization of an additional variable within a range-based for statement
 lambdas in unevaluated contexts
 default constructible and assignable stateless lambdas
 allow pack expansions in lambda init-capture
 class types in non-type template parameters, also allowing string literals as template parameters
 removing the need for typename in certain circumstances
 new standard attributes [[no_unique_address]], [[likely]] and [[unlikely]]
 conditional explicit, allowing the explicit modifier to be contingent on a boolean expression
 expanded constexpr: virtual functions, union, try and catch, dynamic_cast and typeid, std::pointer_traits
 immediate functions using the new consteval keyword
 signed integers are now defined to be represented using two's complement (signed integer overflow remains undefined behavior)
 a revised memory model
 various improvements to structured bindings (interaction with lambda captures, static and thread_local storage duration)
 coroutines
 using on scoped enums
 constinit keyword

Library 

 ranges (The One Ranges Proposal)
 std::make_shared and std::allocate_shared for arrays
 atomic smart pointers (such as std::atomic<shared_ptr<T>> and std::atomic<weak_ptr<T>>)
 std::to_address to convert a pointer to a raw pointer
 calendar and time-zone additions to <chrono>
 std::span, providing a view to a contiguous array (analogous to std::string_view but span can mutate the referenced sequence)
 std::erase and std::erase_if, simplifying element erasure for most standard containers
 <version> header
 std::bit_cast<> for type casting of object representations, with less verbosity than memcpy() and more ability to exploit compiler internals
 feature test macros
 various constexpr library bits
 smart pointer creation with default initialization
 contains-method for associative containers
 bit operations, such as leading/trailing zero/one count, and log2 operations
 std::bind_front

New and changed keywords 

Many new keywords added (and the new "spaceship operator", operator <=>), such as concept, constinit, consteval, co_await, co_return, co_yield, requires (plus changed meaning for export), and char8_t (for UTF-8 support). And explicit can take an expression since C++20. Most of the uses of the volatile keyword have been deprecated.

In addition to keywords, there are identifiers with special meaning, including new import and module.

New attributes in C++20:
[[likely]], [[unlikely]],  and [[no_unique_address]]

Removed and deprecated 

Removed features:

 The C-derived headers <ccomplex>, <ciso646>, <cstdalign>, <cstdbool> and <ctgmath> were removed, as they serve no purpose in C++. (The corresponding <*.h> headers remain, for compatibility with C.)
 The use of throw() as an exception specification was removed.
 Some previously deprecated library features were removed, including std::uncaught_exception,  std::raw_storage_iterator, std::is_literal_type, std::is_literal_type_v, std::result_of and std::result_of_t.

Deprecated features:

 Use of comma operator in subscript expressions has been deprecated
 (most of) volatile has been deprecated

Published as Technical Specifications 

 Parallelism TS v2 (including task blocks)
 Reflection TS v1
 Networking TS v1

Deferred to a later standard 

 Contracts a new study group (SG21) has been formed to work on a new proposal
 Reflection
 Metaclasses
 Executors
 Networking extensions, including async, basic I/O services, timers, buffers and buffer-oriented streams, sockets, and Internet protocols (blocked by executors)
 Properties
 Extended futures

Compiler support 

Full support
 Visual Studio 2019 supports all C++20 features through its /std:c++latest option, as of version 16.10.0. An option /std:c++20 to enable C++20 mode is added in version 16.11.0. Project properties→Configuration properties→C/C++→Language→C++ Language Standard.

Microsoft's compiler doesn't just support Windows, also Linux (and e.g. Android and iOS), while it then requires the "Visual C++ for Linux Development extension".

Partial
 Clang has partial C++20 support that can be enabled with the option -std=c++20 (version 10 and later) or -std=c++2a (version 9 and earlier).
 EDG eccp started implementing C++20 features in version 5.0 and as of version 6.1 supports most C++20 core language features.
 GCC added partial, experimental C++20 support in 2017 in version 8 through the option -std=c++2a. Like Clang, GCC replaced this option with -std=c++20 in version 10. It also has an option to enable GNU extensions in addition to the experimental C++20 support, -std=gnu++20.

History 

Changes applied to the C++20 working draft in July 2017 (Toronto) include:

 concepts (what made it into the standard is a cut-down version; also described as "Concepts Lite")
 designated initializers
 [=, this] as a lambda capture
 template parameter lists on lambdas
 std::make_shared and std::allocate_shared for arrays

Changes applied to the C++20 working draft in the fall meeting in November 2017 (Albuquerque) include:

 three-way comparison using the "spaceship operator", operator <=>
 initialization of an additional variable within a range-based for statement
 lambdas in unevaluated contexts
 default constructible and assignable stateless lambdas
 allow pack expansions in lambda init-capture
 string literals as template parameters
 atomic smart pointers (such as std::atomic<shared_ptr<T>> and std::atomic<weak_ptr<T>>)
 std::to_address to convert a pointer to a raw pointer

Changes applied to the C++20 working draft in March 2018 (Jacksonville) include:

 removing the need for typename in certain circumstances
 new standard attributes [[no_unique_address]], [[likely]] and [[unlikely]]
 calendar and time-zone additions to <chrono>
 std::span, providing a view to a contiguous array (analogous to std::string_view but span can mutate the referenced sequence)
 <version> header

Changes applied to the C++20 working draft in the summer meeting in June 2018 (Rapperswil) include:

 contracts (later deferred to a later standard)
 feature test macros
 bit-casting of object representations, with less verbosity than memcpy() and more ability to exploit compiler internals
 conditional explicit, allowing the explicit modifier to be contingent on a boolean expression
 constexpr virtual functions

Changes applied to the C++20 working draft in the fall meeting in November 2018 (San Diego) include:

 ranges (The One Ranges Proposal)
 concept terse syntax
 constexpr union, try and catch, dynamic_cast, typeid and std::pointer_traits.
 various constexpr library bits
 immediate functions using the new consteval keyword
 signed integers are now defined to be represented using two's complement (signed integer overflow remains undefined behavior)
 refinements of the contracts facility (access control in contract conditions) (see list of features deferred to a later standard)
 a revised memory model
 smart pointer creation with default initialization

Changes applied to the C++20 working draft in the winter meeting in February 2019 (Kona) include:

 coroutines
 modules
 various improvements to structured bindings (interaction with lambda captures, static and thread_local storage duration)

Changes applied to the C++20 working draft in the summer meeting in July 2019 (Cologne) include:

 contracts were removed (see list of features deferred to a later standard)
 use of comma operator in subscript expressions has been deprecated
 constexpr additions (trivial default initialization, unevaluated inline-assembly)
 using scoped enums
 various changes to the spaceship operator
 DR: minor changes to modules
 constinit keyword
 changes to concepts (removal of -> Type return-type-requirements)
 (most of) volatile has been deprecated
 DR: [[nodiscard]] effects on constructors
 The new standard library concepts will not use PascalCase (rather standard_case, as the rest of the standard library)
 text formatting (std::format,  chrono integration, corner case fixes)
 bit operations
 constexpr INVOKE
 math constants
 consistency additions to atomics (std::atomic_ref<T>, std::atomic<std::shared_ptr<T>>)
 add the <=> operator to the standard library
 header units for the standard library
 synchronization facilities (merged from: Efficient atomic waiting and semaphores, latches and barriers, Improving atomic_flag, Don't Make C++ Unimplementable On Small CPUs)
 std::source_location
 constexpr containers (std::string, std::vector)
 std::stop_token and joining thread (std::jthread)

Changes applied during the NB comment resolution in the fall meeting in November 2019 (Belfast) include:

  Class Types in Non-Type Template Parameters (NTTP): The restriction of no user-defined operator== allowed has been removed as the meaning of template argument equality has been divorced from operator==. This allows also for array members in class-type NTTP.
  Floating-point types, pointers and references and unions and union-like classes (class types containing anonymous unions) are now allowed as NTTP.
  Function identity now also includes trailing requires-clauses (P1971)
  Constrained non-template functions have been removed
  <compare> is now available in freestanding implementations
 std::spans typedef was changed from index_type to size_type to be consistent with the rest of the standard library
  Concept traits have been renamed to follow the renaming of the concepts as a result from the Cologne meeting
  Several fixes and additions to ranges (P1456R1: Move-only views, P1391R4: Range constructor for std::string_view (constructor from iterator-pair of characters), P1394R4: Range constructor for std::span<ref>, P1870R1: forwarding-range<T> is too subtle)
  Initialization for std::atomic<T> has been changed to make it work with default and list initialization, std::latch and std::barrier can now report the maximum number of threads that the implementation supports through the new member function max()
  std::weak_equality and std::strong_equality have been removed as they are not used anymore
  Algorithms in <numeric> have been made constexpr
  Missing feature-test macros for new or changed features of C++20 have been added

References

External links 
 Link to purchase ISO/IEC 14882:2020 from the ISO online store.
 N4860, the final draft version of the standard.
 JTC1/SC22/WG21 the ISO/IEC C++ Standard Working Group (a.k.a. the C++ Standards Committee)
 Ranges (range-v3) GitHub repository, by Eric Niebler

C++
C++ programming language family
Programming language standards
Programming languages created in 2020
IEC standards
ISO standards